The Pearlscale (or Chinshurin in Japanese) is a spherical-bodied fancy goldfish with doubled finnage similar to the fantail.

Description
The characteristic feature of the Pearlscale is its thick, domed scales with pearl-like appearance. Its body is round and similar to a golf ball. The finnage may be long or short. Pearlscales can reach up to 8 inches long and grow up as large as an orange. Pearlscale goldfish are susceptible to swimbladder disorders which affect the ability to maintain normal position in the water. This is attributed to the selective breeding process of fancy goldfish to achieve particular body forms, such as that of the Pearlscale's roundness, which results in the alteration of the appearance of the shape and function of the swimbladder. The Pearlscale can also known as the Ping Pong Pearlscale and Golfball Pearlscale.

Breed standard 
The Pearlscale standard is as follows:

 Depth of body to be greater than 2/3 of body length
 Scales to be domed
 Dorsal fin to be single, all other fins to be paired
 Caudal fin to be divided and forked and held above the horizontal
 Extremities of fins to have a slightly rounded appearance
 Minimum length of body to be 5.5 cm (2¼ inches)

The fish should be bright and alert and displaying well developed domed scales all over the body area. The body should be short and rounded (not elongated). The caudal fin should be held high without signs of drooping and well divided. Quality fish will have high color intensity extending into the fins.

Coloration
Pearlscales come in every fancy goldfish color variety.

The color may be metallic (ideally self-colored or variegated in a pleasing pattern and similar on each side), orange or calico. The Pearlscale may also be fully black in color. Metallic colors should appear as burnished metal, extending into the fins. Calico fish should have a blue background with patches of violet, red, orange, yellow and brown, spotted with black.

Variants
Pearlscales are found without headgrowth (wen), with Oranda-like headgrowth, or with two large bubble domes. The bubble-domed Pearlscales are known as High-head Pearlscale, Crown Pearlscale or Hama Nishiki.

Special requirements
Like many fancy goldfish, Pearlscales are egg-shaped with internal organs crowded in a compacted body, therefore overfeeding should be avoided. Pearlscales are very sensitive to cold water and should not be exposed to temperatures below 55°F (13°C). They are also quite vulnerable to pH changes and should not be exposed for long periods to overly acidic or alkaline environments.

See also
Goldfish
Oranda
Fantail

References

External links
 Varieties of Goldfish -About Pearlscale

th:เกล็ดแก้ว